Theo Fabergé (London, 26 September 1922 – 20 August 2007) was a grandson of Peter Carl Fabergé. His father Nicholas Fabergé, Carl's youngest son, arrived in London in 1906 to help run the only branch of the House of Fabergé outside Russia, on Dover Street in London. After 1917, Nicholas remained in London, and in 1922, his son Theo was born.

Life and career
From an early age, Theo Fabergé had a passion for making objects of a highly crafted standard. A fascination with the natural beauties of wood led Theo to explore the techniques of ornamental turning, the art of deep-cut engraving and sculpting woods, ivories and metals using precision lathes. He restored a Holtzappfel lathe originating from 1861, and in the 1950s began to design and make elegant objets d'art from rare wood and ivory, for pleasure and then as commissions. 

Theo soon began to receive commissions from notable collectors of Carl Fabergé, and from museums such as the Virginia Museum of Fine Arts in the United States. In 1984, Theo was persuaded to produce a collection to be sold on the international market, incorporating precious metals, crystal, enamelling, stone-carving, precious gems and porcelain. The St Petersburg Collection was launched to the public in 1985 at Marshall Fields in Chicago.

Theo's daughter, Sarah Fabergé, launched her first designs for the St Petersburg Collection in 1994. Theo and his daughter Sarah worked on a variety of commissions – from the White House Egg for the United States President, to the Brotherhood Egg for Boys' Town. 

At the time of the establishment of the St Petersburg Collection, the Duke of Gloucester admired Theo's work at 'The Art of the Master Turner' exhibition at the Science Museum in London. Princess Alexandra, The Hon Lady Ogilvy received Theo's Presentation Golden Egg. The Duke of York came aboard the vessel Sthtandart in 1999, when it arrived in the Pool of London bearing the oak for Theo's Sthtandart eggs. The Duke and Duchess of York commissioned the Hole in One Egg in aid of a children's charity. In 2003, Theo was commissioned by the Royal Air Force to produce their commemorative piece for the centenary of the Wright Brothers' first flight, the first being presented to the Duke of Edinburgh.

The Collection is shown in major outlets throughout the world. Eminent museums such as the State Hermitage Museum, the San Diego Fine Arts Museum and the St Petersburg City Museum have catalogued Theo Fabergé's creations within their collections.

References

 Obituary, The Times, 31 August 2007
 Obituary, The Independent, 6 October 2007

External links
 Theo Fabergé Biography on OrnamentalTurning.net

1922 births
2007 deaths
Theo Faberge
English jewellers